Ajitsinh Parvatsinh Chauhan is an Indian politician. He is a Former Member of the Gujarat Legislative Assembly from the Balasinor Assembly constituency since 2017 to 2022. He is associated with the Indian National Congress.

References 

Members of the Gujarat Legislative Assembly
Indian National Congress politicians
Year of birth missing (living people)
Living people